Guillaume Guillon-Lethière (10 January 1760 – 22 April 1832) was a French neoclassical painter.

Life
Born free in Guadeloupe in 1760 to a French colonial official named Pierre Guillon and a "mulatto" mother, Lethière has been often written about in the context of French colonial history and the French Revolution.

At 14 years old, his father took him from Guadeloupe to Metropolitan France. By the age of 17, Guillon-Lethièrehe had become the student of Gabriel François Doyen at the Académie royale de peinture et de sculpture. Lethière won second prize in the Prix de Rome of 1784 for his painting Woman of Canaan at the Feet of Christ. He entered again two years later, and while he did not win, he succeeded in receiving support to travel to Rome where he further developed his neoclassical style. Lethière remained in Rome for several years

In 1791 he returned to Paris to open a painting studio in direct competition with Jacques-Louis David. In 1818 Lethière was finally elected and also awarded the Légion d’honneur.

A year later he became a professor at the École des Beaux-Arts. Among his students were Isidore Pils and Polish -Lithuanian painter Kanuty Rusiecki. Lethière was foster father to Mélanie d'Hervilly, later Hahnemann.

Gallery

References

Further reading

B. Foucart, G. Capy and G. Flrent Laballe, Guillaume Guillon Lethière (Paris and Point-à-Pitre, 1991).
Darcy Grimaldo Grigsby, "Revolutionary Sons, White Fathers and Creole Difference: Guillaume Guillon Lethière's Oath of the Ancestors of 1822" Yale French Studies 101 (2002): pp. 201–226.
T. Oriol, Les Hommes célèbres de La Guadeloupe (Basse-Terre, 1935), pp. 39–47.

External links
 

French neoclassical painters
1760 births
1832 deaths
Prix de Rome for painting
Academic staff of the École des Beaux-Arts
18th-century French painters
French male painters
19th-century French painters
French people of Guadeloupean descent
19th-century French male artists
18th-century French male artists